Clodomil Orsi, was the Corinthians Chairman, elected on 1 August 2007, winning the elections with 264 votes. He was succeeded by Andrés Sanchez.

Clodimil Orsi currently works in Corinthians with Wilson Bento and Antoine Gebran

External links
 Web Corinthians

Living people
Brazilian football chairmen and investors
Year of birth missing (living people)